Daniel "Red" Raudabaugh (born March 30, 1987) is an American football coach, former player, who is currently the offensive coordinator for the Frisco Fighters. He played college football at Miami University.

High school career
Raudabaugh attended Coppell High School, in Coppell, Texas, where he was a member of the football and baseball team. He completed 95-of-187 passes for 1,282 yards and eight touchdowns during his senior season and was a second-team all-district selection in 2004. He was also a second-team all-district selection as a pitcher.

College career
Raudabaugh attended Miami University, where he was a member of the football team. He finished his career ranked 5th on the RedHawk's all-time passing yards (5,352). He was third in all-time career completions (511) and also third in the school’s all-time pass attempts (916).

College career statistics 

Source:

Professional career
Raudabaugh was rated the 52nd best quarterback in the 2010 NFL Draft by NFLDraftScout.com. He had a tryout with the Cincinnati Bengals in April 2010.

Dallas Vigilantes
Raudabaugh signed late in the 2010 season, with the Dallas Vigilantes, and saw action in its final two games. He engineered a 62–56 Dallas victory in the season finale against the Bossier–Shreveport Battle Wings by turning in a 22-of-29 performance for 311 yards. He also tied a Vigilantes team high with eight touchdown passes in the game. For the season, Raudabaugh completed 31-of-46 passes (67.4%) for 442 yards and 10 touchdowns. He threw one interception and had a passer rating of 128.8.

In 2011, Raudabaugh was the starter for the entire season. He finished the season having completed 360-of-557 passes (64.8%) for 4,741 yards and 90 touchdowns. He threw seven interception and had a passer rating of 118.3.

Philadelphia Soul

Raudabaugh followed Vigilantes head coach Clint Dolezel to the Philadelphia Soul in 2012. Raudabaugh led the Soul to ArenaBowl XXV in 2012, where they fell to the Arizona Rattlers. Raudabaugh lead the Soul to another ArenaBowl in 2013, once again facing the Rattlers.

In 2015, he earned AFL MVP, Offensive Player of the Year and First Team All-Arena honors after throwing for 4,995 yards and 119 touchdowns. In 2016, he threw for 4,303 yards and 101 touchdowns, earned Second Team All-Arena accolades and helped the Soul beat the Arizona Ratters in ArenaBowl XXIX. In 2017, he threw for 3,175 yards and 82 touchdowns, earned Second Team All-Arena accolades and helped the Soul beat the Tampa Bay Storm in ArenaBowl XXX.

After the 2019 season, the AFL folded. He again followed Soul head coach Clint Dolezel to the expansion Frisco Fighters of the Indoor Football League, but as an offensive coordinator on the coaching staff.

Statistics

Stats from ArenaFan:

References

External links

 Miami RedHawks bio 
 Dallas Vigilantes bio
 Philadelphia Soul bio 

1987 births
Living people
American football quarterbacks
Miami RedHawks football players
Dallas Vigilantes players
Philadelphia Soul players
Players of American football from Texas
People from Coppell, Texas